CBC TV 8 (8PX-TV) is a television station owned and operated by public broadcaster Caribbean Broadcasting Corporation in Barbados. It is the only legally licensed terrestrial television station in Barbados and is owned by the Government of Barbados; its studios are located in The Pine, Saint Michael. Channel 8 is affiliated with the Caribbean Broadcast Media Partnership on HIV/AIDS, the Caribbean Media Corporation and its subsidiary the Caribbean Broadcasting Union.

History
CBC TV first signed on in 1964 on channel 3, and became the first West Indian station to air colour broadcasts in 1971. It moved to channel 9 in 1984 and its current channel position, channel 8, in 1991.

Broadcast schedule
TV 8's local programs include Mornin' Barbados every weekday from 6:30 to 8:00 a.m.

The station's news broadcast, at 7:00 p.m., runs for an hour on weekdays and 30 minutes on weekends; The station also shows movies late at night.

Coverage
CBC-TV 8 can also be seen on channel 108 on Multi-Choice TV, the CBC's wireless cable television system. The broadcasting area of the station also reaches the neighbouring islands of Dominica, Grenada, Saint Lucia, and Saint Vincent and the Grenadines.

The station provides Barbadians with some off-air news and sports updates via social media including Facebook and Twitter. Rebroadcasts of the news and other special programmes are posted on the station's official YouTube channel "CBCBARBADOS".

See also
Caribbean Broadcasting Corporation (CBC)
Communications in Barbados
List of television stations in the Caribbean

References

External links

Television channels and stations established in 1964
Television in Barbados
Mass media in Barbados
Caribbean Broadcasting Corporation